Hassell, also von Hassell, is an English and German surname. Notable people with the surname include the following:

 Albert Young Hassell (1841–1918), Australian pastoralist and politician
 Alex Hassell (born 1980), English actor
 Bill Hassell (born 1943), Australian former politician
 Bobby Hassell (born 1980), English footballer with Mansfield Town and Barnsley
 Eddie Hassell (1990–2020), American actor
 Ethel Hassell née Clifton (1857–1933) colonial author of Albany, Western Australia
 Frank Hassell (born 1988), American basketball player
 Gerald Hassell (born 1952), American banker
 J. T. Hassell (born 1995), American football player
 John Hassell (artist) (c. 1767 – 1825), English artist
 John Frederick Tasman Hassell (1788–1883), Australian pastoralist
 Jon Hassell (1937–2021), American trumpet player and composer
 Kenyatté Hassell, American politician
 Leroy R. Hassell, Sr. (1955–2011), American judge; first African-American Chief Justice of Virginia
 Michael Hassell (born 1942), a British biologist, noted for his work in population ecology, especially in insects
 Randall G. Hassell, American karate expert
 Tina Hassel (born 1964), German journalist
 Trenton Hassell (born 1979), American basketball player
 Ulrich von Hassell (1881–1944), German diplomat; executed for his participation in the 20 July assassination plot against Hitler

See also
 Hasell (surname)

English-language surnames
German-language surnames